Mardini is a surname derived from Al-Mardini (Arabic: المارديني), which denotes an origin from Mardin, Upper Mesopotamia.

People with the surname include:

Bahia Mardini (fl. 2000s–2020s), Syrian Kurdish researcher in international law
Masawaih al-Mardini (died 1015), Assyrian physician
Robert Mardini (born 1972), Lebenese-born Swiss Red Cross director
Yusra Mardini (born 1998), Syrian Olympic swimmer portrayed in the 2022 biographical film, The Swimmers

See also
 Mardin (surname), Turkish surname
 Mahishasura Mardini, 1959 Indian Kannada-language film
 Martini (surname), Italian surname